Conrad L. Mallett Jr. (born October 12, 1953) is a Michigan jurist and businessman who currently serves as corporation counsel for the city of Detroit. Prior to being approved by Detroit City Council  as corporation counsel, Mallett was deputy mayor of the city under Mayor Mike Duggan.

Career 
Mallett served as a Justice on the Michigan Supreme Court from December 21, 1990 to January 2, 1999, acting as chief justice in 1997 and 1998. Mallett was the first African American to serve as chief justice on the Michigan Supreme Court.

Mallett also sat on the Board of Directors of Lear Corporation, served as president of Detroit Medical Center (DMC) Sinai-Grace Hospital from 2003 to 2011, and acted as interim CEO of DMC Huron Valley-Sinai Hospital in 2017. He also previously served as a partner at the Detroit law firm Miller Canfield.

Mallett was named corporation counsel for the City of Detroit in 2022.

Suppression of police officer discipline records 

Following Mallett's appointment as Detroit's corporation counsel, the city began redacting police officers' disciplinary records requested under the Freedom of Information Act. Previously, the city had disclosed officer discipline files in full. As corporation counsel, Mallett heads the city's law department, which processes FOIA requests.

Ross Jones, an investigative reporter with WXYZ, reported that the city denies FOIA requests for officer discipline records by citing the Bullard-Plawecki Employee Right to Know Act, saying that the act prohibits the release of discipline records older than four years. However, attorneys questioned the city's policy, noting that the Right-to-Know Act itself states that it "shall not be construed to diminish a right of access to records" provided under FOIA.

Mallett defended the city's policy in an interview with WXYZ. The policy was criticized by longtime Detroit police commissioner Willie Bell, activist Tristan Taylor, and multiple employment law attorneys. WXYZ has appealed the city's decision to redact records that its newsroom had requested.

References

External links
Bloomberg profile of Conrad L. Mallett Jr.
Conrad Mallett Jr. (1953 - ) Encyclopedia.com

Living people
1953 births
African-American judges
Justices of the Michigan Supreme Court
Lawyers from Detroit
20th-century American judges
20th-century African-American people
21st-century African-American people